The 2018–19 season was Gabala's 14th season in the Azerbaijan Premier League, the top-flight of Azerbaijani football. The club participated in the Premier League, finishing fourth. They also entered the Azerbaijan Cup, defeating Sumgayit 1-0 to win their first title. They also played in the Europa League, where they were eliminated by Progrès Niederkorn in the first qualifying round.

Season Events
At the end of the previous season, Roman Hryhorchuk left the club after his contract expired, with Sanan Gurbanov being appointed as the club's new manager on a two-year contract.
On 16 June, Sabien Lilaj signed a one-year contract, with the option of a second, from Skënderbeu Korçë. Ten days later, 26 June, Gabala signed their second player from Skënderbeu Korçë, Nigerian forward James Adeniyi on a three-year contract.
On 3 July, Lalawélé Atakora signed a one-year contract with Gabala, with the option of an additional year.

On 6 January 2019, Anar Nazirov returned to Gabala for his third spell with the club, signing on an 18-month contract from Zira, whilst Agil Mammadov moved to Neftchi Baku the following day.

On 9 January 2019, young midfielder Hajiagha Hajili, made his season-long loan deal with Qarabağ a permanent transfer. On 11 January, Davit Volkovi signed from Saburtalo Tbilisi on a one-year contract.

Transfers

In

Out

Loans out

Trial

Released

Squad

Out on loan

Friendlies

Competitions

Azerbaijan Premier League

Results summary

Results

League table

Azerbaijan Cup

Final

UEFA Europa League

Qualifying rounds

Squad statistics

Appearances and goals

|-
|colspan="14"|Players away from Gabala on loan:
|-
|colspan="14"|Players who left Gabala during the season:

|}

Goal scorers

Disciplinary record

References

External links 
Gabala FC Website
Gabala FC at UEFA.com
Gabala FC at Soccerway.com
Gabala FC at National Football Teams.com

Gabala FC seasons
Gabala
Azerbaijani football clubs 2018–19 season